Parulia is a village in East Singhbhum district in the Indian state of Jharkhand. It consists of two separate neighborhoods, Chota Parulia and Bara Parulia. It has a population of nearly 2500. The village is located near the villages of Kumardubi and Jagannathpur.

Festivals 
Citizens from Parulia celebrate Laxmi Puja, Rash Purnima, Kartik Brata, Makar sankranti and Shiv Puja and Durga Puja.

References 
 

Villages in East Singhbhum district